This is a list of butterfly species found in the union territory of Chandigarh in India.

Milkweed butterflies (Danainae)

Tirumala limniace (blue tiger)	
Danaus genutia (common tiger)
Danaus chrysippus (plain tiger)
Euploea core (common Indian crow)
Melanitis leda (common evening brown)

Satyrs or browns (Satyrinae) 

Mycalesis perseus (common bushbrown)
Mycalesis mineus (dark-branded bushbrown)
Ypthima baldus (common fivering)
Ypthima asterope (common threering)

Brush-footed butterflies (Nymphalidae) 

Phalanta phalantha (common leopard)
Ariadne merione (common castor)
Ariadne ariadne (angled castor)
Acraea violae (tawny coster)
Junonia lemonias (lemon pansy)
Junonia almana (peacock pansy)
Junonia atlites (grey pansy)
Junonia iphita (chocolate pansy)
Vanessa cardui (painted lady)
Vanessa indica (Indian red admiral)
Argynnis hyperbius (Indian fritillary)
Precis hierta (yellow pansy)
Junonia orithya (blue pansy)
Neptis hylas (common sailer)
Cyrestis thyodamas (common map)
Libythea myrrha (club beak)
Athyma selenophora (staff sergeant)

Gossamerwings (Lycaenidae) 

Talicada nyseus (red Pierrot)
Castalius rosimon (common Pierrot)
Azanus ubaldus (bright babul blue)
Freyeria trochylus (grass jewel)
Lampides boeticus (pea blue)
Cigaritis vulcanus (common silverline)
Virachola isocrates (common guava blue)
Leptotes plinius (zebra blue)
Zizeeria maha (pale grass blue)

Whites and sulphurs (Pieridae) 

Delias eucharis (common Jezebel)
Pontia daplidice (Bath white)
Belenois aurota (pioneer white)
Gonepteryx rhamni (common brimstone)
Eurema blanda (three-spot grass yellow)
Catopsilia crocale (common emigrant)
Catopsilia pyranthe (mottled emigrant)
Ixias marianne (white orange tip)
Ixias pyrene (yellow orange tip)
Colias croceus (dark clouded yellow
Pieris brassicae (Indian large cabbage white)

Pieris canidia (Indian cabbage white)

Swallotails (Papilionidae) 

Papilio polytes (common Mormon)
Papilio demoleus (lime butterfly)
Graphium doson (common jay)

Skippers (Hesperiidae) 
	

Spialia galba (Indian skipper)
Baoris guttatus bada (straight swift)
Pelopidas mathias (small branded swift )

References
 

Chandigarh
Lists of butterflies of India